Reza Azimi was a senior military officer during the reign of Shah Mohammad Reza Pahlavi. He was a general and held various military and government posts, including commander of the Imperial Iranian Ground Forces and minister of war.

Biography
Azimi served as the commander of the Imperial Iranian Ground Forces between 1960 and 1966. He left the office due to illness. Then he was made general adjutant to the Shah Mohammad Reza Pahlavi which he held until 1970. 

Later Azimi served as the minister of war between 1971 and 1977 in the cabinet led by Prime Minister Amir Abbas Hoveyda. He was appointed to the post on 13 September 1971. Azimi was among the nine members of the cabinet who were not Hoveyda's appointees or proteges. His deputy at the ministry was also a retired army officer, Hassan Toufanian. During his tenure Azimi dealt with legislative and budgetary issues, whereas his deputy, Toufanian, was responsible for the procurement of arms in accordance with the Shah's orders. 

Azimi retained his post in the succeeding cabinets first led by Prime Minister Jamshid Amouzegar and then by Prime Minister Jafar Sharif-Emami. He was also appointed minister of war to the military government which was formed by Gholam Reza Azhari in November 1978 and lasted until the end of December. 

As of 1990 Azimi was residing in Paris, France.

References

External links

20th-century Iranian politicians
Defence ministers of Iran
Exiles of the Iranian Revolution in France
Imperial Iranian Armed Forces four-star generals
Year of birth missing
Year of death missing